A pop-up exhibition is a temporary art event, less formal than a gallery or museum but more formal than private artistic showing of work. Pop-up exhibits are erroneously called pop-up museums, such as the Museum of Ice Cream but do not fit the International Council of Museums definition of a museum.    The idea began in 2007 in New York City where space for exhibiting artistic work is very limited. Although the idea originated from New York City, pop-up exhibitions occur all around the world. A recent example is Banksy's Dismaland, which ran from August to September 2015.

Pop-up exhibitions usually allow for a more immersive experience for the visitor. Unlike most traditional museums, some pop-up exhibitions encourage the viewer to interact with the artwork. With this interaction, the exhibition allows for a "public curation," where the artwork is sometimes dependent on the user interaction. Many pop-ups are also intended to open up conversation and discussion about relevant social issues.  

Pop-up exhibitions allow the artist to interact with viewers from different regions of the world, and give viewers the opportunity to engage with the art in person. Pop-up exhibitions are beneficial for artist to spread their art around the world.

References

Visual arts exhibitions